The 2022 Swiss Open (officially known as the Yonex Swiss Open 2022 for sponsorship reasons) was a badminton tournament that took place in St. Jakobshalle at Basel, Switzerland from 22 to 27 March, with a total prize pool of $180,000.

Tournament
The 2022 Swiss Open was the sixth tournament of the 2022 BWF World Tour and was part of the Swiss Open championships which has been held since 1955. It was organized by the Swiss Badminton with sanction from the Badminton World Federation.

Venue
This tournament took place at St. Jakobshalle in Basel, Switzerland.

Point distribution 
Below is the point distribution table for each phase of the tournament based on the BWF point system for the BWF World Tour Super 300 event.

Prize pool
The total prize money was US$180,000 with the distribution of the prize money in accordance with BWF regulations.

Men's singles

Seeds 

 Viktor Axelsen (second round)
 Anders Antonsen (quarter-finals)
 Anthony Sinisuka Ginting (semi-finals)
 Jonatan Christie (champion)
 Loh Kean Yew (withdrew)
 Ng Ka Long (withdrew)
 Srikanth Kidambi (semi-finals)
 Lakshya Sen (withdrew)

Finals

Top half

Section 1

Section 2

Bottom half

Section 3

Section 4

Women's singles

Seeds 

 Chen Yufei (withdrew)
 P. V. Sindhu (champion)
 He Bingjiao (withdrew)
 Busanan Ongbamrungphan (final)
 Michelle Li (quarter-finals)
 Mia Blichfeldt (withdrew)
 Wang Zhiyi (withdrew)
 Kirsty Gilmour (semi-finals)

Wildcard 
Swiss Badminton awarded a wild card entry to Jenjira Stadelmann of Switzerland.

Finals

Top half

Section 1

Section 2

Bottom half

Section 3

Section 4

Men's doubles

Seeds 

 Mohammad Ahsan / Hendra Setiawan (first round)
 Aaron Chia / Soh Wooi Yik (semi-finals)
 Satwiksairaj Rankireddy / Chirag Shetty (second round)
 Fajar Alfian / Muhammad Rian Ardianto (champions)
 Kim Astrup / Anders Skaarup Rasmussen (quarter-finals)
 Ong Yew Sin / Teo Ee Yi (quarter-finals)
 Mark Lamsfuß / Marvin Seidel (quarter-finals)
 Goh Sze Fei / Nur Izzuddin (final)

Finals

Top half

Section 1

Section 2

Bottom half

Section 3

Section 4

Women's doubles

Seeds 

 Chen Qingchen / Jia Yifan (withdrew)
 Jongkolphan Kititharakul / Rawinda Prajongjai (semi-finals)
 Gabriela Stoeva / Stefani Stoeva (champions)
 Maiken Fruergaard / Sara Thygesen (first round)
 Apriyani Rahayu / Siti Fadia Silva Ramadhanti (withdrew)
 Ashwini Ponnappa / N. Sikki Reddy (quarter-finals)
 Liu Xuanxuan / Xia Yuting (withdrew)
 Amalie Magelund / Freja Ravn (withdrew)

Finals

Top half

Section 1

Section 2

Bottom half

Section 3

Section 4

Mixed doubles

Seeds 

 Wang Yilyu / Huang Dongping (withdrew)
 Praveen Jordan / Melati Daeva Oktavianti (first round)
 Marcus Ellis / Lauren Smith (second round)
 Tan Kian Meng / Lai Pei Jing (semi-finals)
 Thom Gicquel / Delphine Delrue (quarter-finals)
 Goh Soon Huat / Shevon Jemie Lai (final)
 Mathias Christiansen / Alexandra Bøje (quarter-finals)
 Mark Lamsfuß / Isabel Lohau (champions)

Finals

Top half

Section 1

Section 2

Bottom half

Section 3

Section 4

References

External links
 Tournament Link
 Official Website

Swiss Open (badminton)
Swiss Open
Swiss Open
Swiss Open